Germigny may refer to the following communes in France:

Germigny, Marne, in the Marne department
Germigny, Yonne, in the Yonne department
Germigny-des-Prés, in the Loiret department
Germigny-l'Évêque, in the Seine-et-Marne department
Germigny-l'Exempt, in the Cher department
Germigny-sous-Coulombs, in the Seine-et-Marne department
Germigny-sur-Loire, in the Nièvre department